Hutter or Hütter is a surname of German origin that refers to:

Gardi Hutter (born 1953), Swiss clown-comedian, author, actress and cabaretartist
Gero Hütter (born 1968), German hematologist, known for performing a bone marrow transplant on a patient with HIV
Jacob Hutter (1500–1536), Tyrolean Anabaptist leader and founder of the Hutterites
Julia Hütter (born 1983), German pole vaulter
Leonhard Hutter (1563–1616), German Lutheran theologian
Marcus Hutter (born 1967), German physicist and computer scientist
Matt Hutter (born 1971), American race car driver
Michael Hutter (born 1983), American professional wrestler best known as Ethan Carter III
Ralf Hütter (born 1946), German musician and singer
Reinhard Hütter (contemporary), theologian and professor; Lutheran convert to Roman Catholicism
Ulrich W. Hütter (1910–1990), Austrian-German engineer and scientist
Wolfgang Hutter (1928–2014), Austrian painter, draughtsman, printmaker and stage designer

See also
Various planes designed by Ulrich W. and Wolfgang Hütter in the 1930s and 1940s:
Hütter Hü 17
Hütter Hü 28
Hütter Hü 136
Hütter Hü 211